Weapons of the Gods (神兵玄奇; hanyupinyin: shén bīng xuán qí) is a Hong Kong comic book series by Wong Yuk Long which began in 1996. It was translated into English by Bob Allen for ComicsOne. A role-playing game version was published by Eos Press in 2005.

The story is set during the turbulent transitional period of Jin Dynasty to Sixteen Kingdoms eras, and traced the contention of various pugilists for the divine weapon known as Heaven's Crystal (天晶). The pair of crystalline blades, crafted by the celestial goddess Nüwa, were used to eradicate demons and devils during the primeval era, and in turn, was said to be cursed by them.

Prelude
There were four dominant pugilistic clans hailing from the four cardinal directions of the realms:
 North : The Bei (北冥) clan, manufacturer of the best weapons in the realms, led by Zheng Bei (北冥正), an ambitious man who dreamed of becoming master of the world.
 South : The Nan (南宫) clan, based on the Sword Island in Lake Tai, led by Yi Nangong, who had mastered the art of the Sword & was well renowned.
 East : The Dong (东方) clan, which held sway over the entire coastal region of Bohai Sea, led by Dongfang Yinian (东方一念). They operated the shipping trade and were as rich as an empire with skills as high as the clouds. 
 West : The Xi (西城) clan, in the Western realms they guarded the pass between east and west, abundant in arms, Its leader, Ho Xi(西城豪), despite being highly skilled, was a rather boorish individual. As a clan they are wealthy but arrogant & unrefined.

In addition, the criminal underworld was dominated by the sinister Heaven-Earth Alliance (天地盟), aka Hell Clan. Its countless minions infiltrate every part of society, and it was widely feared for its brutal methods enforced by most highly skilled members.

The prelude of the tale began in AD 318, with the presentation of Heaven's Crystal by the Imperial Court to Yi Nangong, acknowledged as pugilist master of the southern lands. In the midst of the festivities of the occasion, his wife, Hong Dong (东方雄), was lamenting over the loss of her husband's affection to his concubine, Jade Swallow (玉燕).

The cool, shrewd and proud Dongfang Xiong, nicknamed Heartblade (心剑), was acknowledged to be the most beautiful woman in the world, but was not able to bear her husband a son early in their marriage, prompting him to dote on Jade Swallow who bore him a son. Though Heartblade later gave birth to a son too, her husband became estranged from her, and she did not join in the celebration.

At the great hall, despite being warned by Heartblade not to accept Heaven's Crystal because of its curse, Yi Nangong did and unsheathed the blades. Inferior weapons in the vicinity shattered at the presence of the divine weapon. The Sky-Lord of the Hell Clan arrived to seize it. He had been issued a specially crafted weapon, Thunder Cudgel, for his mission, leading to the Thunder Cudgel clashing in full force against Heaven's Crystal.

The result was a cataclysmic blast that devastated the entire Sword Island, killing everyone present except a handful of survivors led by Hong Dong. She immediately sought out Jade Swallow, only to find the latter had been buried after dying during childbirth.

A month later, a wagon driver arriving at the Beiming foundry in the north discovered the child, Tian Wen (南宫问天), nursing a baby girl with blood from his finger, at the gate. Despite barely graduating from being a toddler, Wentian exhibited great inner strength.

Plot

The story is told 18 years after the prelude is narrated through several concurrent developments which occasionally intersects.

One thread began with two separate threads, one focusing on Dongfang Xiong's reclaiming her legacy, being Dongfang Yinian's firstborn, from her half-brother. Having gathered the survivors of Nangong clan from the cataclysm 18 years before, she returned with vengeance, with her grown-up son, Dongfang Tiexin, to her childhood home where she suffered ignominy for being born a girl.

The other thread focussed on Wentian, having grown up in the Beiming clan with his sister, Wenchai. The Beiming clan was exploring the prospects of a marriage alliance with the Xicheng clan, and Xicheng Hao's son, Xicheng Xiushu (Great Oak) arrived as an emissary.

The Hell Clan took advantage of the two convergences of the greatest sects of the realms to send their most powerful minions to destroy the four clans, or at least cripple them. The master diviner, Zhuo Bufan, had predicted the re-emergence of Heaven's Crystal, and the Hell Clan was intent to wiping out its closest rivals.

As the story developed, more and more divine weapons and instruments were revealed, each having unique powers. There were ten most powerful artefacts created not by mortal hands:

 Heaven's Crystal (天晶)- A pair of 'mother-son' blades, cursed by the demons it banished.
 Tiger's Soul (虎魄) - a vampiric halberd crafted by Chi You.
 Grand Void (太虛) - a single-wheeled chariot crafted by the Yellow Emperor that derived its strength from the righteousness of the user.
 Tablet of Annihilation (十方俱滅) - made by Fuxi, it could manipulate time and space.
 Shennong's Rule (神農尺) - A jade broadsword capable of healing and poisoning.
 Spirit Devourer (噬魂) - A three section staff crafted by Raksha, capable of dealing with the spiritual creatures.
 Heaven's Executor (天誅) - A crossbow crafted by Raksha's sister. It had nine different arrows, each with unique powers.
 Evil Shocker (驚邪) - a two-pronged fork created by the gods of thunder and lightning, with electrical and sonic prowess.
 Divine Dance (神舞) - a pipa made from divine wood formed from Nuwa's arm, capable of sonic attacks as well as hypnosis.
 Phoenix (鳳皇) - An axe crafted by the Great Yü that could control liquids.

The story went far into realms of fantasy, with presence of mythic creatures like sentient draconic beasts.

Sequels
The first story focused primarily on the Ten Weapons of the Gods, and on Nangong Wentian.

A sequel was made with the plot being dealing with attempts to revive a long gone evil overlord. Wentian had to combine the prowess of all ten Weapons of the Gods to deal with the ultimate evil. New artefacts emerged, primarily in the form of ten demonic pearls which thrived on the negative emotions of human beings.

A second sequel was made with the story set hundreds of years later, with a new cast of characters, involving the reunifying the crystal shards from the shattered Heaven's Crystal in a new era of heroes and villains. Poor sales led to the writers making crossover references with another ongoing comic series - Legends of the Sons of Heaven (天子傳奇). However, it was unfavourably received by fans who panned it in online forums as being "neither here nor there".

A couple of prequels were also published, focusing on the grandfather and father of Wentian.

Hong Kong comics titles
Wuxia comics
1996 comics debuts
Comics set in the Jin dynasty (266–420)
Comics set in the Sixteen Kingdoms